Laura López may refer to:

 Laura López (synchronized swimmer) (born 1988), Spanish synchronized swimmer
 Laura López (water polo) (born 1988), Spanish water polo player
 Laura A. Lopez, professor of astronomy